Janakiya Samskarika Vedi (Malayalam for 'Democratic Cultural Forum') was the cultural mass front of the Central Reorganisation Committee, Communist Party of India (Marxist-Leninist) in Kerala, India, 1980-1982. The predecessor of the organisation was the Wynadu Samskarika Vedi from Wynad. The State Secretary of the organisation was Kaviyur Balan. After its formation in 1980, the organisation took over the organ Prerana.

In 1982 the organisation was dissolved due to state repression and inner strife. Many in the movement turned against the CRC, CPI(ML) after the killing of the 'people's enemy' Madathil Mathai in Wynad.

References

Organisations based in Kerala
1980 establishments in Kerala
1982 disestablishments in India
Organizations established in 1980
Organizations disestablished in 1982